Vaucluse, an electoral district of the Legislative Assembly in the Australian state of New South Wales, has had one incarnation from its creation in 1927 until the present.


Members Vaucluse

Election results

Elections in the 2010s

2019

2015

2011

Elections in the 2000s

2007

2003

Elections in the 1990s

1999

1995

1994 by-election

1991

Elections in the 1980s

1988 by-election

1988

1986 by-election

1984

1981

Elections in the 1970s

1978

1976

1973

1971

Elections in the 1960s

1968

1965

1962

Elections in the 1950s

1959

1957 by-election

1956

1953

1950

Elections in the 1940s

1947

1944

1941

Elections in the 1930s

1938
This section is an excerpt from 1938 New South Wales state election § Vaucluse

1936 by-election

1935
This section is an excerpt from 1935 New South Wales state election § Vaucluse

1932
This section is an excerpt from 1932 New South Wales state election § Vaucluse

1930
This section is an excerpt from 1930 New South Wales state election § Vaucluse

Elections in the 1920s

1927
This section is an excerpt from 1927 New South Wales state election § Vaucluse

Notes

References 

New South Wales state electoral results by district